Moraxella lincolnii is a Gram-negative bacterium in the genus Moraxella, which was isolated from the human respiratory tract.

References

External links
Type strain of Moraxella lincolnii at BacDive -  the Bacterial Diversity Metadatabase

Moraxellaceae
Bacteria described in 1993